Archimedes of Tralles was an Ancient Greek writer and grammarian who wrote commentaries on the works of Homer and Plato, and also a work upon mechanics. None of his works have survived to the present day.

Notes

Ancient Greek writers
Ancient Greek grammarians
People from Tralles